Pietro Rovaglia (born 26 February 2001) is an Italian footballer who plays as a forward for  club Montevarchi on loan from Ternana.

Club career
On 22 March 2019, he signed his first professional contract with Chievo until 30 June 2023.

He made his Serie B debut for Chievo on 20 October 2019 in a game against Ascoli. He substituted Riccardo Meggiorini in the 82nd minute. He made his first appearance in the starting lineup on 10 November 2019 against Frosinone.

On 29 January 2021, he joined Serie C club Pistoiese on loan until the end of the 2020–21 season.

On 17 August 2021, he signed a 4-years contract with Ternana. On the same day, he went to Fermana on loan. On 25 January 2022, the loan was terminated early.

On 13 January 2023, he went to Montevarchi on loan.

International career
He first represented his country for the Under-15 squad in 2016. In 2019, he was called up for friendlies of the Under-18 and Under-19 squads.

References

External links
 
 

2001 births
Living people
Footballers from Verona
Italian footballers
Association football forwards
Serie B players
Serie C players
A.C. ChievoVerona players
U.S. Pistoiese 1921 players
Ternana Calcio players
Fermana F.C. players
Montevarchi Calcio Aquila 1902 players
Italy youth international footballers